Molyneux (Old French: De Molines or De Moulins) is a French surname. The surname has been linked primarily to a large French family that settled in Lancashire, England. By the 14th century the Molyneux family had split into three main branches; the Lancashire line, who became the Earls of Sefton, the Nottingham line, and the Calais line, from those remaining in France. There was also a branch of the family who were Irish baronets.

Etymology and history
The ancestors of the Molyneaux family arrived in England in medieval times. The name "de Molines" or "de Moulins", Old French in origin, meaning "Mill", and eventually changed into "Molyneux". The early historical background of the family is sparse, coming from scattered genealogical, historical, and archaeological sources, composed of a mixture of legend, romanticized literary invention, and fact.  Some historians deduce the de Moulins came from Moulineaux-sur-Seine, near Rouen, in Normandy.
  Other sources claim the family originally came from Moulins, France in the region of Auvergne-Rhône-Alpes. Wherever their origin, Robert de Moulins' son, William, settled in Lancashire. He had two sons, William and Vivian de Moulins. William was granted large tracts of land in Lancashire, in what was then called inter Mersam et Ripam, that is, "between the Mersey and the Ribble", and the manors of Septon (Sefton), Thornton, Cuerden, ten carucates and a half of land, at the service of half a knight's fee. William Molyneux made Septon his chief seat and was succeeded by Vivian de Molyneux.

They also held the manor of Little Crosby, later Ince Blundell Hall, which had been held by one Uctred until 1066. By 1212 it was owned by Richard de Molyneux of Sefton before being turned over to the Blundell family. The Molyneuxs later owned most of the districts of Speke and Rainhill. The Royalist gentry family held a large moated manor, a corn mill on the River Alt, and the advowson of St. Helen's Church at Sefton without interruption from about 1100 to 1700.  Their successors, by then Earls, moved to Croxteth Hall. Of the Sefton Molyneux family, crusaders Richard (d. 1290) and William Molyneux (d. 1320) are entombed within the church, and are its oldest inhabitants. Their effigies now lie beneath an arch moulding set into the wall in the Molyneux chapel, which is outside the 14th-century church walls.

In 1436 the office of Hereditary Steward of the Wapentake of Salfordshire was granted to Sir Robert Molyneux of Sefton. The office was held by Sir Robert's successors (descendants of his brother Richard), the Earls of Sefton until 1972. It was the Lancashire line of the family that became the Viscounts Molyneux and later the Earls of Sefton, while there were also branches seated at Nottingham and Calais.

The senior branch of the Sefton family had been staunch Catholics and Royalists (notably in the  17th and 18th centuries) through the worst times until Charles Molyneux, 8th Viscount Molyneux, was rewarded for converting to the Protestant faith. The relatively youthful second and third Viscounts fought on the Royalist side both politically and militarily. Although Liverpool Castle had been partly dismantled in 1660–1678, Caryll Molyneux, the 3rd Viscount, had used it for storing arms. During the reign of King James II, he was outlawed by Parliament for supporting the deposed king in 1688 to 1689. Control of the Castle finally passed out of Molyneux hands after Caryll had again been suspected of participation in a Jacobite plot. William, the 7th Viscount, was a Jesuit, and there were in his time not less than seven Molyneux in the Society of Jesus alone.

Variations 
Variations of the surname include "Mullinax", "Mullenax", "Molinex", "Mullinix", "Mullenneix", "Mullennix", "Mullineaux", "Molinieux", "Molinaux", "Molineaux", "Mollineaux", "Molineux", "Mulleneux" among others.

Notable people with the name

Molyneux
 David Molyneux (born 1943), British parasitologist, professor and former director of the Liverpool School of Tropical Medicine
 Echlin Molyneux (c. 1800–1886), Irish barrister and professor of English Law, Dublin
 Edward Molyneux (1891–1974), British fashion designer working in Paris
 Emery Molyneux (died 1598), English Elizabethan maker of globes, mathematical instruments and ordnance
 Irene Molyneux (1923–2019), English lawn bowls competitor
 Isabella Molyneux, Countess of Sefton (c. 1748–1819), wife of the 1st Earl of Sefton
 John Molyneux (VC) (1890–1972), British soldier, recipient of the Victoria Cross
 John Molyneux (disambiguation), several people
 Joyce Molyneux (born 1932), British chef
 Maxine Molyneux (born 1948), British sociologist and feminist
 Paul Molyneux (1906–1980), English cricketer
 Peter Molyneux (born 1959), British computer game designer
 Robert Molyneux (1738–1808), English-American priest, president of Georgetown University
 Samuel Molyneux (1689–1728), British astronomer and Member of Parliament (son of William)
 Stefan Molyneux (born 1966), Canadian right-wing activist
 Stephen Molyneux (born 1955), British educational technologist
 Thomas Molyneux (statesman) (1531–1597), French-born statesman in Ireland
 Sir Thomas Molyneux, 1st Baronet (1661–1733), Irish physician, great-grandson of the earlier Sir Thomas, and brother of William
 Tim Molyneux (born 1969), American actor, singer, writer, director and producer
 Tom Molyneux (1890–1955), Canadian ice hockey player
 William Molyneux (1656–1698), Irish natural philosopher, and father of Samuel

Viscount Molyneux
For Viscount Molyneux see Earl of Sefton, and in particular:
 Richard Molyneux, 1st Viscount Molyneux (1594–1636)
 Richard Molyneux, 2nd Viscount Molyneux (1620–1654)
 Caryll Molyneux, 3rd Viscount Molyneux (1624–1699)
 William Molyneux, 7th Viscount Molyneux (1685–1759)
 Charles William Molyneux, 1st Earl of Sefton (1748–1794), previously 8th Viscount Molyneux
 William Philip Molyneux, 2nd Earl of Sefton (1772–1838)
 Charles William Molyneux, 3rd Earl of Sefton (1796–1855)
 William Philip Molyneux, 4th Earl of Sefton (1835–1897)
 Charles Molyneux, 5th Earl of Sefton (1867–1901)
 Osbert Molyneux, 6th Earl of Sefton (1871–1930)
 Hugh William Osbert Molyneux, 7th Earl of Sefton (1898–1972)

Molyneaux
Molyneaux is a rare Irish spelling variant. People with this spelling variant include:
James Molyneaux (1920–2015), Baron Molyneaux of Killead, Ulster politician
Jerry Molyneaux (born 1958), athlete who represented the British Virgin Islands at the 1984 Olympics
Jerry Molyneaux (sports administrator) (1955–2016), Irish Gaelic games player and administrator
Joseph W. Molyneaux, American federal judge
Lee Molyneaux, English footballer
Vince Molyneaux, American baseball player

Molineaux
 Tom Molineaux (1784–1818), African-American bare-knuckle boxer
 Othello Molineaux (born 1939), Trinidadian jazz steelpan player

Molineux
 Thomas Molineux (luthier) (c.1700–1757), Irish luthier
 Thomas Molineux (stenographer) (1759–1850), English stenographer
William Molineux (1717–1774), American participant in the Boston Tea Party
 Sophie Molineux (born 1998), Australian cricketer

Mollineux
 Mary Mollineux (1651–1696), English Quaker poet

Mullinix
 Tadd Mullinix, American musician performing as Dabrye
 Henry M. Mullinnix, aviator and Admiral of the United States Navy during World War II
 Siri Mullinix, American soccer goalkeeper

Mullinax
 Trey Mullinax, American professional golfer

Others
Other persons bearing the name Molyneux :
 Lord Henry Howard-Molyneux-Howard, brother of 12th Duke of Norfolk
 Molyneux Shuldham, 1st Baron Shuldham (c. 1717 – 1798), British naval officer and colonial governor of Newfoundland

See also
Molyneux Baronets
Molineux (disambiguation)
Moulineaux
"My Kinsman, Major Molineux", short story by American author Nathaniel Hawthorne

References

Surnames of French origin
Surnames of Norman origin
French-language surnames
Toponymic surnames
Occupational surnames